Werben may refer to:

Werben (Elbe), in Saxony-Anhalt, Germany
Werben (Spreewald), in Brandenburg, Germany